The 2020 Nippon Professional Baseball (NPB) Draft was held on October 26, for the 56th time at the Grand Prince Hotel Takanawa to assign amateur baseball players to the NPB. It was arranged with the special cooperation of Taisho Pharmaceutical with official naming rights. The draft was officially called "The Professional Baseball Draft Meeting supported by Lipovitan D ". It has been sponsored by Taisho Pharmaceutical for the 8th consecutive year since 2013.

Summary 
Only the first round picks will be done by bid lottery. From 2019, the Professional Baseball Executive Committee has decided that the Central League and the Pacific League will be given the second round of waiver priority alternately every other year, and in 2020 Pacific League received the waiver priority.  And since it was held in the middle of the regular season, the second round of Waiver priority was decided according to the ranking as of October 25, the day before. From the third round the order was reversed continuing in the same fashion until all picks were exhausted.

First Round Contested Picks 

 Bolded teams indicate who won the right to negotiate contract following a lottery.
 In the first round, Hiromi Itoh (Pitcher) was selected by the Fighters, Ryoji Kuribayashi (Pitcher)  by the Carp, Taisei Irie (Pitcher)  by the Baystars, and Hiroto Takahashi (Pitcher) by the Dragons without a bid lottery.
 In the second round, Shunpeita Yamashita (Pitcher) was selected by the Buffaloes, Kento Watanabe (Infielder)  by the Lions, Tomoya Inoue (Infielder)  by the Hawks, and Ryuta Heinai (Pitcher) by the Giants without a bid lottery.
 In the thrird  round, the last remaining the Swallows, selected Naofumi Kizawa (Pitcher)
 List of selected players.

Selected Players 

The order of the teams is the order of second round waiver priority.
 Bolded After that, a developmental player who contracted as a registered player under control.
 List of selected players.

Orix Buffaloes

Tokyo Yakult Swallows

Hokkaido Nippon-Ham Fighters

Hiroshima Toyo Carp

Tohoku Rakuten Golden Eagles

Yokohama DeNA Baystars

Saitama Seibu Lions

Hanshin Tigers

Chiba Lotte Marines

Chunichi Dragons

Fukuoka SoftBank Hawks

Yomiuri Giants

References

External links 
 プロ野球ドラフト会議 supported by リポビタンD - NPB.jp Nippon Professional Baseball

Nippon Professional Baseball draft
Draft
Nippon Professional Baseball draft
Nippon Professional Baseball draft
Baseball in Japan
Sport in Tokyo
Events in Tokyo